The Most Honourable Order of Seri Paduka Mahkota Brunei, also translated as The Most Honourable Order of the Crown of Brunei, is an order of Brunei. It was established on 1 March 1954 by Sultan Omar Ali Saifuddien III.

The order consists of three classes:

Recipients

First Class 

 Unknown – Major General Sulaiman – Commander of the Royal Brunei Armed Forces
 Unknown – Marsal Maun – Menteri Besar
 Unknown – Ibrahim Mohd Jahfar – Speaker of Legislative Council
 Unknown – Abdul Rahman – Speaker of Legislative Council
 Unknown – Kemaluddin Al-Haj – Speaker of Legislative Council
 Unknown – Lim Jock Seng – Minister of Foreign Affairs and Trade II
 Unknown – Amin Liew – Minister of Finance and Economy II
 Unknown – Ahmaddin Abdul Rahman – Minister of Home Affairs
 1963 – Alam Abdul Rahman – Speaker of Legislative Council
 1963 – Yusuf Abdul Rahim – Menteri Besar
 1963 – Dennis White – British High Commissioner to Brunei
 1969 – Kemaluddin Mohd Yassin – Principal Officer of the Department of Religious Affairs
 1970 – Marianne E. Lloyd-Dolbey – Personal Secretary to Sultan Omar Ali Saifuddien III
 1984 – Denys Roberts –  Chief Justice of the Supreme Court of Brunei Darussalam
 2006 – Yasmin Umar – Minister of Energy
 2006 – Lau Ah Kok – Founder of Hua Ho
 2018 – John Barry Mortimer – President of the Court of Appeal
 2018 – Ahmaddin Abdul Rahman – Deputy Minister of Finance
 2018 – Matsatejo Sokiaw – Deputy Minister of Energy and Industry 
 2018 – Elinda C.A. Mohammad – Deputy Minister at the Prime Minister's Office

Second Class 

 Unknown – Abdul Momin Ismail – Menteri Besar
 Unknown – Suyoi Osman – Minister of Development
 Unknown – Mustappa Sirat – Minister of Communications
 Unknown – Ali Apong – Minister of Primary Resources and Tourism
 1954 – Anthony Abell – British High Commissioner to Brunei
 2007 – Lim Jock Hoi – Secretary-General of ASEAN
 2007 – Salbiah Sulaiman – Member of the Legislative Council
 2009 – Hayati Mohd Salleh – Attorney General of Brunei
 2010 – Bahrin Abdullah – Deputy Minister of Finance
 2010 – Mahadi Ibrahim – Auditor General
 2010 – Abdul Ghafar Ismail – Brunei's High Commissioner to Singapore
 2010 – Sidek Ali – Brunei's High Commissioner to India
 2010 – Janin Erih – Brunei's Permanent Representative at the United Nations
 2010 – Zasia Sirin – Member of the Legislative Council
 2011 – Zulkarnain Hanafi – Minister of Health
 2012 – Major General Aminan – Commander of the Royal Brunei Armed Forces
 2018 – Jefri Abdul Hamid – Assistant Commissioner of Police
 2018 – Ahmad Hassan – Assistant Commissioner of Police
 2018 – Yussof Bahar – Acting Director of the Criminal Investigation Department

Third Class 

 Unknown – Brigadier General Wardi – Commander of the Royal Brunei Air Force
 Unknown – Major General Tawih – Commander of the Royal Brunei Armed Forces
 Unknown – Major General Hamzah – Commander of the Royal Brunei Armed Forces
 Unknown – First Admiral Abdul Halim – Commander of the Royal Brunei Navy
 Unknown – Abu Bakar Apong – Minister of Home Affairs
 1969 – Lim Cheng Choo – Member of Privy Council
 1986 – Major General Halbi – Commander of the Royal Brunei Armed Forces
 2003 – Major General Aminuddin Ihsan – Commander of the Royal Brunei Armed Forces
 2006 – First Admiral Abdul Aziz – Commander of the Royal Brunei Navy
 2012 – Major General Haszaimi – Commander of the Royal Brunei Armed Forces
 2017 – Brigadier General Shahril Anwar – Commander of the Royal Brunei Air Force
 2017 – Brigadier General Sharif – Commander of the Royal Brunei Air Force
 2017 – Brigadier General Saifulrizal – Commander of the Royal Brunei Land Forces

References 

Orders, decorations, and medals of Brunei
Awards established in 1954
1954 establishments in Brunei